A referendum on real estate was held in Switzerland on 2 July 1967. Voters were asked whether they approved of a popular initiative against real estate speculation. The proposal was rejected by a majority of voters and cantons.

Background
The referendum was a popular initiative, which required a double majority; a majority of the popular vote and majority of the cantons. The decision of each canton was based on the vote in that canton. Full cantons counted as one vote, whilst half cantons counted as half.

Results

References

1967 referendums
1967 in Switzerland
Referendums in Switzerland